Sandin may refer to:

Places
 Sandin 2-y, a village in Kuyurgazinsky District, Bashkortostan, Russia
 Sandino, Cuba
 Sandin, Kuyurgazinsky District, Republic of Bashkortostan, Russia
 Sandin, Zamora, Spain

Other uses
 Sandin (name)
 Sandin Image Processor, a video synthesizer
 The Sandin family, in The Purge (2013 film)

See also
 Augusto César Sandino (1895–1934), Nicaraguan revolutionary